Øvrevollen Bluff is a rock and ice bluff just south of Festninga Mountain in the Mühlig-Hofmann Mountains of Queen Maud Land. It was mapped by Norwegian cartographers from surveys and air photos by the Norwegian Antarctic Expedition (1956–60) and named Øvrevollen ("the upper wall").

References

Cliffs of Queen Maud Land
Princess Martha Coast